Godspeaker is an adult trilogy of fantasy novels written by Karen Miller set in a fantasy world full of political intrigue, magic, and ancient prophecies.

Story 
The novel follows the journey of a young slave girl named Hekat as she rises to become one of the most powerful and feared leaders in the land.

Born into a life of hardship and suffering, Hekat is sold into slavery as a child and forced into mining work. When she discovers that she possesses a rare and mysterious power that sets her apart from those around her, she begins to plot her escape from slavery.

As Hekat's power and influence grow, she becomes increasingly ruthless and single-minded in her pursuit of dominance. Her actions ripples throughout the world, and she quickly gains both loyal followers and bitter enemies. As Hekat's destiny unfolds, the world she inhabits is forever changed by her presence.

Series
 Empress of Mijak (2007)
 The Riven Kingdom (2007)
 Hammer of God (2008)

Fantasy novel series
Novels by Karen Miller